Didier Levallet (born 19 July 1944, in Arcy-sur-Cure, France) is a French jazz double bassist, composer, arranger and leader.

A self-taught bassist, Levallet made his professional debut in Paris in 1969, working with such artists as Ted Curson, Johnny Griffin, Kenny Clarke, Mal Waldron, Hank Mobley, Archie Shepp, Tony Oxley, Steve Lacy, Harry Beckett and Didier Lockwood.

Levallet was director of the French National Jazz Orchestra from 1997 to 2000 He has also served as an educator at the L’École Nationale de Musique in Angoulême, and regularly hold workshops and music concerts in Cluny, France.

References

1944 births
Living people
People from Yonne
French jazz double-bassists
Male double-bassists
French jazz composers
Male jazz composers
Avant-garde jazz double-bassists
Knights of the Ordre national du Mérite
21st-century double-bassists
21st-century French male musicians
Brotherhood of Breath members
Orchestre National de Jazz members